Senogaster dentipes is a species of hoverfly in the family Syrphidae.

Distribution
Suriname, Brazil.

References

Eristalinae
Insects described in 1787
Diptera of South America
Taxa named by Johan Christian Fabricius